Sergio Molina may refer to:
 Sergio Molina (footballer, born 1983)
 Sergio Molina (footballer, born 1996)
 Sergio Molina Silva, Chilean politician
 Sergio E. Molina, victim in a DUI vehicle crash, see Ethan Couch#Lawsuits